Oblongoolithus is an oogenus of dinosaur eggs, from the Campanian Barun Goyot Formation of Mongolia. The oogenus contains one oospecies O. glaber.

See also 
 List of dinosaur oogenera

References

Bibliography 
 Carpenter, K. 1999. Eggs, Nests, and Baby Dinosaurs: A Look at Dinosaur Reproduction (Life of the Past). Indiana University Press, Bloomington, Indiana
 K. E. Mikhailov. 1996. New genera of fossil eggs from the Upper Cretaceous of Mongolia. Paleontological Journal 30(2):246-248

Dinosaur reproduction
Egg fossils
Campanian life
Late Cretaceous dinosaurs of Asia
Cretaceous Mongolia
Fossils of Mongolia
Barun Goyot Formation
Fossil parataxa described in 1996